George Washington Elliott (7 January 1889 – 27 November 1948) was a football player for Middlesbrough and England during the early 20th century.

On 3 May 1909, he signed for Middlesbrough. He played his first few games at inside right, but later converted to a centre-forward. He also won three England caps.

He was top scorer in the Division One during the 1913–14 season with 31 goals, and (as of 1989) held the club record for most goals in a single match, with 11 for the Reserves in a 14–1 win over Houghton Rovers. He was top scorer during seven out of nine of Boro's peacetime seasons from 1910–11.

He spent all of his 'Boro career in the top flight until relegation in his penultimate season made his final season was spent in the second tier. His last appearance was against Southampton in 1924–25 after which he retired, and resumed his job as a cargo superintendent at Middlesbrough docks. In total he made 344 League appearances for Middlesbrough, scoring on 203 occasions.

References

External links

1889 births
1948 deaths
English footballers
England international footballers
Association football forwards
Middlesbrough F.C. players
English Football League players
First Division/Premier League top scorers
South Bank F.C. players
English Football League representative players
Footballers from Sunderland
British Army personnel of World War I
Royal Engineers soldiers
Royal Garrison Artillery soldiers
Military personnel from County Durham